Mamay is a 2003 Ukrainian language film.  Based on ancient Ukrainian and Crimean Tatar folklore, this is a Ukrainian version of Romeo and Juliet. A fugitive Cossack falls in love with a stunningly beautiful Tatar woman who saves him from certain death. Their love defies age-old hatred between their respective peoples. The film features  cinematography by Serhiy Mykhalchuk and a  soundtrack by composer Alla Zahaikevych. It was directed by Oles Sanin.  Mamay was Ukraine's 2003 submission for an Academy Award for Best Foreign Language Film.

Plot 
Created on the basis of ancient Ukrainian and Crimean Tatar folklore. This is the Ukrainian version of Romeo and Juliet. A fugitive Cossack falls in love with a stunningly beautiful Tatar woman who saves him from imminent death.

Director Sanin wrote about the combination of three stories in the film: two epic Crimean Tatar and one invented by him — how a Tatar woman finds the youngest dying Cossack in the steppe. brings him home, treats; falls in love with him, becomes his wife.

Cast 

 Viktoria Spesivtseva as Tatar Woman
 Andrij Bilous as Mamay
 Nazl Sejtablaeva as Little Tatar Girl
 Sergey Romanyuk as Eldest Brother
 Oles Sanin as Middle Brother
 Akhtem Seitablaev as Tatar Warrior
 Eldar Akimov as Tatar Warrior
 Emil Rasilov as Tatar Warrior

Production costs 
The film's budget amounted to 280 thousand dollars.

Production 
The shooting lasted only 24 days.

References

External links
 "Mamay" at Ukrainian Film Club of Columbia University (link inactive as of 2014.10.26)
 "Mamay" at Ukrainian Film Club of Columbia University (retrieved on 2014.10.26)
 

Ukrainian drama films
Ukrainian-language films
Crimean Tatar-language films
2003 films
Films based on Romeo and Juliet
Crimean Tatar culture
Films set in Ukraine
Films based on folklore
Works about Cossacks
Works about ethnic conflict